Federasi Sepakbola Klungkung (commonly known as FSK Klungkung) is an Indonesian football club based in Klungkung Regency, Bali. Club played in Liga 3.

References

External links

Football clubs in Indonesia
Football clubs in Bali